Lev Atamanov, born Levon Konstantinovich Atamanyan (– 12 February 1981), was a Soviet Armenian animation director.

Atamanov was one of the foremost Soviet animation film directors and one of the founders of Soviet animation art. He is the director of famous classics of Soviet animation, such as the prize-winning fairy tales The Yellow Stork (Zhyoltyy aist) (1950), Scarlet Flower (Alenkiy tsvetochek) (1952), The Golden Antelope (1954), the full-length animation The Snow Queen (1957), and the modern satirical tale The Key (1961). In his works Lev Atamanov subtly conveyed the national coloring of fairy tales and combined romantic elation in images of positive characters with warm and kind humor.

Atamanov was one of the most respected Soviet animators and is regarded as one of the greatest artists in the history of animation. He was named People’s Artist of the Russian Federation in 1978.

In a 2021 interview Hayao Miyazaki cited Atamanov's 1957 film The Snow Queen as a seminal influence on his work and his favorite film.

Life and career
Levon Konstantinovich Atamanyan was born in Moscow, Russia on February 21, 1905 into an Armenian family. Atamanov studied acting and directing with Lev Kuleshov at the Gerasimov Institute of Cinematography, graduating in 1926. Atamanov first worked as an assistant to the painter and animator Yuri Merkulov and later joined Mezhrabpomfilm Studio. Atamanov’s debut was the short public service announcement Across the Street (1931, with Vladimir Suteev), which explained traffic rules. He then made one of the first animated sound pictures, The Tale of the Little White Bull (1933), an allegorical anti-Western pamphlet directed against the League of Nations.

In 1936 Atamanov moved to Yerevan where at Armenfilm Studio he directed the first Armenian animated films, Dog and Cat (1938), from a fairy tale by Hovhannes Tumanyan, and  The Priest and the Goat (1941). During the Great Patriotic War, Atamanov served in the Red Army. After his discharge, he completed one more animated film in Armenia, The Magic Carpet (1948). He then returned to Moscow and joined Soyuzmultfilm studio. Atamanov’s animated features; The Golden Antelope (1954) from Indian fairy tales and The Snow Queen (1957) from Hans Christian Andersen’s tale proved to be successful domestically and internationally. He later tried out a variety of styles and topics, among them political satire, for example, in That’s in Our Power (1970), from caricatures of Danish Communist cartoonist Herluf Bidstrup, who was popular in the Soviet Union.

Filmography
The story about the white bull-calf (1933)
The Blot in the Arctic (1934)
Blot-barber (1935)
The dog and the cat (1938)
The priest and the goat (1941)
The magic carpet (1948)
The yellow stork (1950) - the first work at Soyuzmultfilm studio
The Scarlet Flower (1952)
The gold antelope (1954)
The dog and the cat (1955) - a remake of the version of 1938
The Snow Queen (1957)
Roads of spring (1959)
The thieves of paints (1959)
The Key (1961)
The fairy tales about another's paints (1962)
Jokes (1963)
The shepherdess and the chimney sweep (1965)
The bouquet (1966)
The bench (1967)
The fence (1967) Kaleidoscope-68
The cyclist (1968) Kaleidoscope-68
The ballerina by the ship (1969)
It in our forces (1970)
Confusion (collection) (1971)
Petrushka (1971)
Above head! (1972)
The short stories about the space (1973)
The pony runs in round (1974)
I remember … (1975)
The kitten by the name of Bark (1976) (release 1)
The kitten by the name of Bark (1977) (release 2)
The kitten by the name of Bark (1979) (release 3)
The kitten by the name of Bark (1980) (release 4)

See also
 Aleksandr Ptushko
 Ivan Ivanov-Vano
 Alexander Rou

References

External links

 Biography of Lev Atamanov

1905 births
1981 deaths
People's Artists of the RSFSR
Russian animated film directors
Russian animators
Soviet animation directors
Soviet animators
Soviet Armenians